White Potato Lake is a lake located in Oconto County, Wisconsin. The lake is a seepage lake with a majority sand and muck bottom.

See also
 List of lakes of Wisconsin

References

Lakes of Wisconsin